Ali Progri (October 10, 1929 - March 24, 2009) was an Albanian engineer. He was a participant in World War II and afterwards was graduated in Kiev, Ukraine (then part of Soviet Union). He had a remarkable career and held various high-ranking positions during his lifetime. Ali Progri was awarded the distinguished title Merited Teacher of Albania.

Early life and education
Ali Progri was born in the village of Progër in Albania, on 19 October 1929 and was the son of Muharrem Progri. He took part actively in the Albanian Resistance of World War II and after finishing his high school in Albania he went to Kiev, Ukraine in 1948 for his academic studies. In 1953 he was graduated from Kiev Polytechnic Institute, achieving high results.

Career
After returning to Albania he was active in the field of engineering and was among the founders of the modern University of Tirana in 1957 (even though the first academic institute, The Pedagogical Institute of Tirana was founded on December 20, 1946) and eventually he earned the position of vice-dean of the Faculty of Civil Engineering. Thanks to his experience and intellectual profile he would be chosen as Director in the Directory of Professional  Middle Education in the Council of Ministers of Albania. As a distinguished engineer and expert in the field of applied mechanics he also earned the position of the Chief Technology Officer of the Train Factory in Tirana. Nevertheless, he is most notable for his 27 years as the Principal of the Polytechnic High School of Tirana.

For his contribution in the Albanian Resistance of World War II he was awarded by the Parliament of Albania the Medal of Liberation and Memory and for the experience and contribution in the education field, he gained the honorific title Merited Teacher of Albania''. The engineer Ali Progri also held the title Professor. He died in Tirana, on 24 March 2009, at the age of 80.

References

1929 births
2009 deaths
Albanian engineers
Engineering academics
People from Devoll (municipality)
20th-century engineers
Academic staff of the Polytechnic University of Tirana